Total of best lifts in military press, snatch and jerk.  Ties were broken by the lightest bodyweight.

Final 

Key: WR = world record; =WR = equaled world record; OR = Olympic record; DNF = did not finish; NVL = no valid lift

References

External links
Official report

Weightlifting at the 1972 Summer Olympics